Wilhelm Gottlieb Becker (4 November 1753, in Oberkallenberg in Saxony – 3 June 1813, in Dresden) was a German art historian, numismatist, and author.

Biography
He received an early education in Gera, then studied law at Leipzig (1773–76). Following graduation, he taught classes at the Philanthropinum in Dessau, and for several years traveled abroad, during which time, he visited Strasbourg, Basel, and Zurich (1778–82). He became a professor at the Ritterakademie in Dresden in 1782. In 1795 he was appointed director of the Dresden Gallery of Antiques, and of the Coin Cabinet, and in 1805 he was also entrusted with the directorship of the celebrated Grünes Gewölbe ("Green Vault").

Works
His chief work was Taschenbuch zum geselligen Vergnügen ("Handbook for social enjoyment"; Leipzig 1791–1814). He was also the author of Erholungen ("Recreations"; Leipzig 1796–1810), Augusteum, Dresdens antike Denkmäler enthaltend ("Augusteum, location of Dresden's old monuments"; 1805–1809), with 162 engravings, Zweihundert seltene Münzen des Mittelalters ("200 rare coins from the Middle Ages"; 1813), and a large number of popular handbooks of art.
He edited the Encomium moriae of Erasmus ("In Praise of Folly"; Basel, 1780), and published the works of Holbein (Berlin, 1781).

Family
His son Wilhelm Adolf Becker was a noted classical scholar.

References
 
 
 

1753 births
1813 deaths
German art historians
German numismatists
People from Zwickau (district)
Leipzig University alumni
German male non-fiction writers